The 1992 UCF Knights football season was the fourteenth season for the team and eighth for Gene McDowell as the head coach of the Knights. McDowell's 1992 team posted 6–4 overall record (and one exhibition game win). During the 1992 season, Dr. John Hitt, UCF's fourth president, announced that the program would make the move to Division I-A (FBS) in 1996.

On October 3, the school made history by becoming the first team to play a team from Russia on American soil. The Knights played an exhibition game against the Moscow Bears of the Russian League of American Football. The Knights prevailed by the score of 42–6 in front of 5,412 at the Citrus Bowl.

Schedule

References

UCF
UCF Knights football seasons
UCF Knights football